Roy Mitchell Bennett (born July 5, 1961) is a former American and Canadian football defensive back in the National Football League (NFL) and Canadian Football League (CFL). He played for the San Diego Chargers of the NFL and the Winnipeg Blue Bombers and Edmonton Eskimos of the CFL. Bennett played college football at Jackson State.

References

1961 births
Living people
Players of American football from Birmingham, Alabama
Players of Canadian football from Birmingham, Alabama
American football defensive backs
Canadian football defensive backs
Jackson State Tigers football players
Winnipeg Blue Bombers players
San Diego Chargers players
Edmonton Elks players